Falemao "Mao" Tosi (born December 12, 1976) is a former American football player, a defensive tackle for two seasons in the National Football League (NFL). He is the only Samoan to date to be named Alaska's high school basketball player of the year.

Early years
Born in Manuʻa District, American Samoa, he moved with his family at age three to San Diego, California, and to Anchorage, Alaska, about a decade  When his parents returned to San Diego, he stayed in Anchorage with an older brother. At East Anchorage High School, he starred in basketball for the Thunderbirds with teammate Trajan Langdon.

College
After graduation from high school in 1995, Tosi received a basketball scholarship to Butler Community College in El Dorado, Kansas, northeast of Wichita. The Grizzlies were ranked #1 in the country during the 1996–97 season, and finished third in the NJCAA Tourney during the 1995–96 season.

He received a scholarship to play basketball at the University of Idaho in Moscow, where he excelled as a dual-sport athlete, also playing football for the Vandals at defensive tackle in 1998  In 1998, Idaho won the Big West Conference title and upset Southern Mississippi in the Humanitarian Bowl in Boise and finished with a  The next year, the Vandals were  entering the final game against rival Boise State for the conference title, but Tosi was kept out by the medical staff due to a neck stinger, and the Vandals were

Pro football
At the 2000 NFL Draft, he was selected in the fifth round (136th) by the Arizona Cardinals, where he started ten games as a rookie and led the defensive line in tackles. Injured in his third season in 2002, and was diagnosed with a genetic defect in his neck, spinal stenosis, which ended his

After football
Tosi moved back to Alaska to raise his young family. In 2006, Tosi founded AK P.R.I.D.E. (Alaskan People Representing Integrity and Diverse Experiences) to combat gang activity and help teenagers. In 2014 he ran unsuccessfully for the Anchorage Assembly.

References

External links
Alaska High School Hall of Fame – Mao Tosi

1976 births
Living people
American football defensive tackles
Arizona Cardinals players
Butler Grizzlies football players
Idaho Vandals football players
Players of American football from Anchorage, Alaska
Players of American football from American Samoa
Players of American football from San Diego
American sportspeople of Samoan descent